Jalan Masjid KLIA, Federal Route 341, is an institutional facilities federal road in Kuala Lumpur International Airport (KLIA) in Malaysia.

At most sections, the Federal Route 341 was built under the JKR R5 road standard, allowing maximum speed limit of up to 90 km/h.

List of junctions

References

Malaysian Federal Roads
Kuala Lumpur International Airport
Sepang District
Roads in Selangor